The Writers Guild of Canada is an organization representing more than 2,500 professional writers working in film, television, radio, and digital media production in Canada. Members of the Guild write dramatic TV series, feature films, Movies of the Week,  documentaries, animation, comedy and variety series, children's and educational programming, radio drama, as well as corporate videos and digital media productions. The organization administers the annual WGC Screenwriting Awards.

The WGC is the voice of professional Canadian screenwriters - lobbying on their behalf, protecting their interests, and working to raise the profile of screenwriters and screenwriting.  Most importantly, on behalf of its members, the Guild negotiates, administers and enforces collective agreements, setting out minimum rates, terms, and working conditions in the Guild's jurisdiction — all English-language production in Canada. The central collective agreement, the Independent Production Agreement (IPA), is negotiated between the Guild and the Canadian Media Production Association (CMPA), the association representing independent producers in Canada.  In addition to the IPA, the Guild also has agreements in place with the APFTQ, CBC Radio, CBC Television, CTV, the NFB and TVOntario. The WGC is formally recognized as the official bargaining agent for English-language professional screenwriters under the federal Status of the Artist Act and Quebec's Status of the Artist Legislation.

The Guild is a member of the International Affiliation of Writers Guilds, comprising: the Australian Writers' Guild, The Writers' Guild of Great Britain, The Writers Guild of America (East & West), Societe des Auteurs, Recherchistes, Documentalistes et Compositeurs (Quebec) and the New Zealand Writers Guild.

The WGC also serves the industry by:
 Providing industry-standard writing contracts and checking agreements to ensure they comply with the WGC's collective agreements
 Ensuring proper payment of script fees and royalties and resolving disputes over working conditions and credits
 Serving as the voice for screenwriters by undertaking extensive policy and lobbying activities, working closely with government agencies to promote Canada's indigenous film and television industry
 Publishing Canadian Screenwriter, a quarterly magazine with features, news, reviews and vital industry information
 Administering a script registration service to help writers protect their work
 Hosting an annual awards ceremony honouring outstanding screenwriting
 Keeping an on-line directory of members for industry organizations
 Providing professional development and training opportunities for members and new writers
 Administering the Canadian Screenwriters Collection Society, which collects royalties and levies arising from secondary uses made in Europe and other jurisdictions

History
In 1943 The Association of Canadian Radio Artists was formed in order to establish better working conditions and wages for radio performers.  Writers joined in on this organization, and over the next decade the organization transformed into the Association of Canadian Television and Radio Artists.

By 1984 the Alliance of Canadian Cinema, Television and Radio Artists (ACTRA) was formed to better include the other areas of the broadcasting industry.  From this organization, other Guilds formed and matured.  Most notably the ACTRA Performer's Guild, Writers Guild of Canada, and ACTRA Media Guild.  In 1993 The Writers Guild of Canada left ACTRA and became an independent union.

The Writers Guild of Canada, however, is different from the traditional union.  There is no central workplace in the writing industry, and members are not employees, they are independent contractors.  This creates legal complications as Provincial labour legislation states that only employees, not independent contractors (with exception of construction workers), can bargain as a collective.  This means that WGC members are bound to very tight restrictions in order to protect their rights and their work.

Governance
Two bodies govern the Guild jointly: a seven-member council and a fifteen-member national forum. Both the council and the national forum are made up of elected Guild members. These members are elected from Canada's five regions (Atlantic, Quebec, Central, Western and Pacific). Terms last for two years. The council oversees activities and sets Guild policies, while the national forum meets annually with the council and the executive staff to add their input.
The Guild's executive staff is in charge of managing the Guild's day-to-day operations. The Executive director of the Guild is Maureen Parker.
Council Members:
 President: Jill Golick (Central Region)
 Vice-President: Andrew Wreggitt (Western Region)
 Treasurer: Mark Ellis (Central Region)
 Councillors: Michael Amo (Atlantic Region), Denis McGrath (Central Region), Anne-Marie Perrotta (Quebec Region), Dennis Heaton (Pacific Region)

Membership
You are qualified to join the WGC if you:
 Are within the WGC's jurisdiction
 Have one writing contract
 Are with a producer who is 'signatory' to one of the WGC's agreements.

Membership fees are dependent on  when you join:
 Before July 1: $500 ($350 initiation fee + $150 basic fee)
 After July 1: $425 ($350 initiation fee + $75 basic fee)
 To remain a member you must pay the $150 annual fee.

Benefits of Membership:
 Fair Pay:  The WGC ensures that screenwriters are paid fairly through administration, and enforcement, of collective agreements.  In addition, the WGC resolves disputes on behalf of its members.  Members also have access (through ACTRA Fraternal Benefit Society) to insurance and retirement benefits.
 Advocacy:  The WGC consistently advocates, on behalf of its members, for policies and programs that better support Canadian screenwriters.  By working with the CRTC, Canadian Government, and other industry partners, the WGC is dedicated to being a voice for Canadian writers.
 Community: The WGC is a great resource for those who want to connect with other writers or producers.  The WGC is a member of the International Affiliation of Writers Guilds (IAWG).
 Profile:  The WGC maintains the Directory of Members which is a great way for potential employers to search out screenwriters.  The WGC also makes an effort to celebrate the achievements of its members, thus raising their profile.
 Intellectual Property Registration Service:  The WGC offers this to both members and non-members.  It is a service that helps establish the identity and date of completion of literary materials (books, scripts, etc.) in order to protect an individual's intellectual property.

Funding Initiatives and Awards
 Bell Media Diverse Screenwriters Program
The Writers Guild runs a program called the Diverse Screenwriters Program in collaboration with Bell Media. This program is geared towards encouraging diversity within the Canadian artistic landscape. The program is divided into two sessions, one for Eastern Canada and one for Western Canada. Up to eight up-and-coming screenwriters participate in each weeklong session or training, and two are offered a paid internship as a writer on one of Bell Media's TV shows.  Participants are also connected with an experienced scriptwriter for three months in order to hone their pitching skills and ideas.
 WGC Screenwriting Awards
These awards have been given out since 1996 to honor the achievements of Guild members in television, film, short film, documentary and writing for the web.
 Sondra Kelly Award
This award is given annually to a female screenwriter who already has several writing credits and a current project in the works. The award gives this screenwriter $5000 to develop a self-initiated project. The winner of the 2012 award will be announced in December.
 Jim Burt Screenwriting Prize
The Jim Burt Prize rewards promising unproduced feature-length screenplays that tell uniquely Canadian stories. The award is named for the late Jim Burt, who was known to champion Canadian films such The Boys of St. Vincent and The War Between Us during his time at the CBC. The winner is awarded a $1,500 cash prize and $2,000 to go towards an experienced story editor to help in the development of their work.
 WGC Showrunner Award
This annual award is given to an exemplary writer/producer that has success in applying their creative vision to the screen.

Recipients:

2012: Mark McKinney

2011: Tassie Cameron

2010: Heather Conkie

2009: Mark Farrell

2008: Peter Mohan

2007: Brad Wright
 Alex Barris Mentorship Award
Writers can nominate a person that has helped them get a start in the industry. This could be anyone, from a teacher to a producer to a story editor.
 WGC Writers Block Award
The recipient of this award is decided by the Council and is someone who has contributed significantly to the Writers Guild and the Canadian screenwriting community.

References

External links
 
 WGC Podcast: Writers Talking TV

 The Big Picture: Why You Shouldn't Work Non-Union by Maureen Parker Executive Director, Writers Guild of Canada

Scriptwriters' trade unions
International Affiliation of Writers Guilds
Canadian writers' organizations
Film organizations in Canada
Screenwriting organizations
Guilds in Canada